Milly is a feminine given name. 

Milly may also refer to:

Places in France
 Milly, Manche, a town in Normandy
 Milly, a former commune integrated into the commune of Chablis
 Milly, a village in the commune of Lucinges

Other uses
 Milly (actress), stage name of Carla Mignone (1905–1980)
 Milly (fashion brand), a womenswear line designed by Michelle Smith
 AEC Militant, a post-war artillery tractor nicknamed "Milly"

See also
 Millie, a feminine given name
 Milly Milly, a sheep and cattle station in Western Australia
 Milly-la-Forêt, a town in Île-de-France, near Paris
 Milly-Lamartine, a town in eastern France
 Milly-sur-Bradon, a town in north-eastern France
 Milly-sur-Thérain, a town in northern France
 Milly-le-Meugon, a village now attached to the city of Gennes, in Western France
 Jacques de Milly (died 1461), 37th Grand Master of the Order of the Knights Hospitaller
 Philip of Milly (c. 1120–1171), baron in the Kingdom of Jerusalem and seventh Grand Master of the Knights Templar
 Robert of Milly,  chamberlain of the County of Champagne and Knight Templar
 Stephanie of Milly (c. 1145/1155-c. 1197), an influential figure in the Kingdom of Jerusalem, daughter of Philip of Milly
 Stephanie of Milly, Lady of Gibelet, 12th century noblewoman, first cousin of the above